Anne Greenbaum (born 1951) is an American applied mathematician and professor at the University of Washington.  She was named a SIAM Fellow in 2015 "for contributions to theoretical and numerical linear algebra".  She has written graduate and undergraduate textbooks on numerical methods.

Education

Greenbaum received her bachelor's degree from the University of Michigan in 1974.  She earned her PhD from the University of California, Berkeley in 1981.

Employment

After receiving her bachelor's degree, Greenbaum worked for the Lawrence Livermore National Laboratory.  She joined the Courant Institute of Mathematical Sciences in 1986, and moved to the University of Washington in 1998.

Awards and honors

Greenbaum received a Best Paper Prize from the SIAM Activity Group on Linear Algebra in 1994, together with Roland Freund, Noel Nachtigal, and Zdenek Strakos.  She received the Bernard Bolzano Honorary Medal for Merit in the Mathematical Sciences from the Czech Academy of Sciences in 1997.  She became a SIAM Fellow in 2015. She was selected as the 2022 AWM-SIAM Sonia Kovalevsky Lecturer.

References

Living people
20th-century American mathematicians
Applied mathematicians
American women mathematicians
University of Washington faculty
Fellows of the Society for Industrial and Applied Mathematics
1951 births
University of Michigan alumni
21st-century American mathematicians
20th-century American women
21st-century American women